One Kiss Ends It All is the eighth album by Saturday Looks Good to Me. It was released on May 21, 2013 through Polyvinyl Records.

Critical reception
One Kiss Ends It All was met with generally favorable reviews from critics. At Metacritic, which assigns a weighted average rating out of 100 to reviews from mainstream publications, this release received an average score of 71, based on 9 reviews.

Track listing

References 

2013 albums
Saturday Looks Good to Me albums
Polyvinyl Record Co. albums